Christoforos Zografos (born March 24, 1969) is a former Greek football referee who currently resides in Athens. He was a full international referee for FIFA since 2004. He belonged at the Athens association.

Zografos was selected as a referee for qualifying rounds of the UEFA Euro 2008, and the qualifying rounds of the UEFA Cup in 2006 and 2007.

See also
List of football referees

External links
FIFA Profile

1969 births
Living people
Greek football referees
Sportspeople from Athens